The Belfast Buildings Trust (BBT), founded in 1996 as the Belfast Buildings Preservation Trust, is a cross-community building preservation trust with charitable status that delivers physical, social, and economic regeneration through the reuse of landmark buildings in Belfast, Northern Ireland.

Each building rescued by the trust seeks to regenerate the community it serves in a variety of ways, from traditional skills promotion to job creation and engendering a sense of civic pride. The BBT's work demonstrates what can be achieved through vision, determination and community energy. It is committed to restoring to Belfast those buildings that make it special, and which are landmarks in the heart of the city's communities.

The current chairman is John Marshall BEM, retired registrar at the Royal Belfast Academical Institution. The founding chair, Fionnuala Jay-O'Boyle CBE DL, with a background in public affairs, has extensive experience of regeneration projects having been a trustee of a number of regeneration charities, including the Prince's Regeneration Trust.

Completed projects
The BBT has completed three regeneration projects: St Patrick's School, Donegall Street; Christ Church, College Square North; and The Gate Lodge at the former Good Shepherd Convent on Ormeau Road, which now serves as the trust's headquarters.

St Patrick's National School (1828)
St Patrick's was built by Newryborn architect Timothy Hevey on land donated by the Marquess of Donegall for the first Catholic national school in the city. It continued to serve the educational needs of the north of the city until it closed in 1982.

Christ Church (1832)
This church, built by the Dublin architect William Farrell suffered a declining congregation and closed in the early 1990s including an arson attack in 1995.

With a similar package of funding to St Patrick's School and a partnership with the board of governors of The Royal Belfast Academical Institution the building is now restored as a library and IT centre, with extensive community use. The building was opened by the Prince of Wales in 2003 and has won many architectural and regeneration awards. This building in particular is proof of the way in which restored buildings can bridge communities when politicians' words cannot.

The Gate Lodge (1867)
The gate lodge at the former Good Shepherd Convent in south Belfast was built as the home for the convent caretaker. The architects were Sherry and Hughes, with a later extension and alterations in 1895 by JJ McDonnell. It is a gabled -storey lodge, situated adjacent to the key junction of the Ormeau Road and Ravenhill Road. Small as it is, the last family to live in the building numbered eleven, including grandparents, parents and seven children.

Long a landmark for both the local community and commuters alike, the building ceased to be a residence in 1974, and lay empty and derelict until the trust agreed a restoration project with the then owners, the Diocese of Down and Connor, in early 2009. Completed in November of the same year, The Gate Lodge, now remarked upon for its bright red exterior, serves as the offices of the BBT and is once again a much loved landmark for the city.

Future projects
The Belfast Buildings Trust was renamed in November 2012. This was to better reflect that its work focuses on regeneration in its widest sense.

The BBT is currently engaged in a number of potential regeneration projects across Belfast. These include the former St. Malachy's School in Sussex Place and Carlisle Memorial Methodist Church. In addition, the trust has been in negotiations with Belfast City Council for some years over the possible restoration of the fine Floral Hall at Belfast Zoo.

Related projects
BBT has long held an awareness of the need to foster civic responsibility and engagement to help protect and regenerate Belfast's authenticity. To this end, the trust assumed responsibility for the organisation of the Northern Ireland Schools Debating Competition from Belfast Civic Trust some years ago.

The trust commissioned and led the creation of The Belfast Opera. A fifteen month long project to co-create a new opera inspired by the city's confident heritage, the work was shaped by people from the city. The music was composed by Neil Martin with a libretto by Glenn Patterson. The world premiere of 'Long Story Short: The Belfast Opera' took place in Carlisle Memorial Church in June 2016, with a specially created community chorus of 101 Belfast residents singing alongside a professional cast and orchestra. It was directed by Conor Hanratty and conducted by David Brophy.

It plays an active role in advocacy and lobbying with government departments, fellow preservation trusts and other bodies interested in preservation and regeneration. It is a member of the Heritage Trust Network.

See also
Building Preservation Trust

References

External links
 

Charities based in Northern Ireland
1996 establishments in Northern Ireland
Building Preservation Trusts